Paul Teufel & Cie Photogerätebau is a Trading company for photographic and optical equipment and until the 1980s, manufacturer of enlargers and photo lab requirements in Stuttgart, Germany.

Products 
 Enlargers: VG 35, VG 6x6, VG 4x5, VG 13x18
 Paper cutting machines: FF 300 and FF 420
 Studio stands: FS 250

Literature 
 Udo Berns: Fotografie und Fotolabortechnik (German), Verlag Beruf + Schule, 1990

External links 
 Website of the company Paul Teufel & Cie in Leinfelden

Companies based in Stuttgart
Photography companies of Germany